This is a list of United States Marine Corps aircraft wings:

Active

Inactive

See also

 List of United States Marine Corps divisions
 List of United States Marine Corps logistics groups

Citations

Aircraft wings